Sharran Kumar is an Indian actor who has appeared in several Tamil language films. He has acted in films including Inidhu Inidhu (2010) and Charles Shafiq Karthiga (2015).

Career
Sharran Kumar made his debut with Prakash Raj's Inidhu Inidhu (2010), before going on to appear in smaller budget ventures such as Vaada Poda Nanbargal (2011) and Pathirama Pathukkunga (2012). Sharran later played the titular role of a cab driver in Isakki (2013) and appeared alongside Sanjeev in Manoj Kumar's Uyirukku Uyiraga (2014) as an engineering student.

In December 2015, he revealed that he would script and direct a short film titled Tea or Coffee with Prithvi Rajan in the lead role. The film was later released online by Aishwarya Dhanush's studio in early 2016. In 2017, Sharran debut in first Hindi short horror movie film titled A Hotel Room released on YouTube. Made under 'Jeet Maharishi' productions & directed by Rajat Sharma.

In the year 2016 Sharran started working on his script. He took two years to complete this. He was keen on exploring his cinematic skills for a full-fledged feature film direction. He associated with Cue entertainment Bangalore to direct this script into a feature film in Tamil and Hindi. Bharath, South’s heartthrob is starring in this thriller titled as Naduvan (2021).

Filmography
Actor

Director
Naduvan (2021)

References

External links 
 

Living people
Male actors in Tamil cinema
21st-century Indian male actors
Tamil male actors
Year of birth missing (living people)